Bob Mathouser (March 15, 1926 – November 15, 1980), was an American racecar driver.

Born in Omaha, Nebraska, Mathouser died in Los Angeles, California.  He drove in the USAC Championship Car series, racing in the 1961-1966 seasons, with 30 career starts, including the 1964 Indianapolis 500.  He finished in the top ten 4 times, with his best finish in 6th position in 1964 at Langhorne.

See also
Sports in Omaha, Nebraska

1926 births
1980 deaths
Indianapolis 500 drivers
Sportspeople from Omaha, Nebraska
Racing drivers from Nebraska